Muradnagar railway station (code: MUD) is a railway station in Ghaziabad district, Uttar Pradesh. It serves Muradnagar city. The station has two platforms. The platforms are not well sheltered.

Muradnagar station is on the Meerut City-Ghaziabad line. Express trains do not halt at this station. Only local passenger trains halt in Muradnagar Railway Station.

Notes

Railway stations in Uttar Pradesh
Railway stations in Ghaziabad district, India
Delhi railway division